Soraya Sarhaddi Nelson is an American journalist.  She directs the National Public Radio (NPR) bureau in Berlin.

Early life, family and education
Nelson was born in Milwaukee, Wisconsin, to a German mother and Iranian father. She was raised in Milwaukee as well as in Iran where her family resided for several years.

She received her undergraduate degree from the College of Journalism at University of Maryland, College Park in 1985.

Career
Nelson began her career in 1985 at The Star Democrat in Easton, Maryland. After working at other newspapers in New York and Virginia, she served three years as editor and reporter at Newsday in New York. She shared the 1997 Pulitzer Prize for coverage of the 1996 TWA Flight 800 crash.

She subsequently joined the Los Angeles Times as a reporter, and following the September 11 attacks went on extended assignment in Iran and Afghanistan.

From 2002 to 2005, she worked as Knight Ridder's Middle East Bureau Chief.  Nelson also worked for the Orange County Register covering California Governor Arnold Schwarzenegger.

In total, she was a newspaper reporter for more than 20 years.

NPR

Nelson joined NPR in 2006. Her reports are featured on several NPR programs, including Morning Edition, All Things Considered, and Weekend Edition. In 2006, she founded the NPR's permanent bureau in Kabul, which was the first permanent presence in Afghanistan for a US broadcast network.

For her coverage of Afghanistan, Nelson received a Peabody Award in 2010. The award recognized Nelson's efforts over the previous year, which included a series on Afghan citizens turning to drugs to escape everyday miseries and the country's limited ability to offer rehabilitation; the story of determined girls breaking societal taboos and facing dangers to pursue an education; and a detailed account of how US Marines struggle to establish trust with locals in order to combat the Taliban. Peabody judges concluded that "No reporter in any medium gives us a better sense of the variety of life inside Afghanistan."

In June 2010, Nelson was assigned to cover the Arab World from NPR's Cairo, Egypt, bureau.

She received the Gracie Award and Overseas Press Club Award in 2010.  In 2011, she received the 59th Elijah Parish Lovejoy Award for courageous journalism, the first non-newspaper journalist to receive the award. She has received an honorary Doctor of Laws degree from Colby College. Nelson's reporting on the wars in Iraq and Afghanistan, the Arab Spring uprisings, and subsequent developments in the Middle East were credited for her receiving these honors.

Personal life
Nelson speaks Persian, Dari and German in addition to her native English.

Nelson is married. Her husband, Erik Nelson, is also a University of Maryland graduate (class of 1987). They have a son.

References

External links

American women journalists
American reporters and correspondents
Elijah Parish Lovejoy Award recipients
Living people
NPR personalities
University of Maryland, College Park alumni
Year of birth missing (living people)
Peabody Award winners
American writers of Iranian descent
American people of German descent
21st-century American women